Nephrurus wheeleri, also known commonly as the banded knob-tailed gecko, the southern banded knob-tailed gecko, and Wheeler's knob-tailed gecko, is a species of lizard in the family Carphodactylidae. The species, like all species of Nephrurus, is endemic to Australia.

Etymology
The specific name, wheeleri, is in honor of American entomologist William Morton Wheeler.

Geographic range
N. wheeleri is found in the Australian state of Western Australia.

Habitat
The preferred natural habitats of N. wheeleri are shrubland and rocky areas.

Reproduction
N. wheeleri is oviparous.

References

Further reading
Cogger HG (2014). Reptiles and Amphibians of Australia, Seventh Edition. Clayton, Victoria, Australia: CSIRO Publishing. xxx + 1,033 pp. . (Nephrurus wheeleri, p. 269).
Loveridge A (1932). "New lizards of the genera Nephrurus and Amphibolurus from Western Australia". Proceedings of the New England Zoölogical Club 13: 31–34. (Nephrurus wheeleri, new species).
Oliver PM, Bauer AM (2011). "Systematics and evolution of the Australian knob-tailed geckos (Nephrurus, Carphodactylidae, Gekkota): Pleisomorphic grades and biome shifts through the Miocene". Molecular Phylogenetics and Evolution 59 (3): 664–674.
Wilson S, Swan G (2013). A Complete Guide to Reptiles of Australia, Fourth Edition. Sydney: New Holland Publishers. 522 pp. .

Geckos of Australia
Nephrurus
Reptiles described in 1932
Taxa named by Arthur Loveridge